James Francis Lynam (born September 15, 1941) is an American former college and professional basketball coach. He coached at the college level for Fairfield University from 1968 to 1970, American University from 1973 to 1978, and St. Joseph's University from 1978 to 1981. In the National Basketball Association (NBA), Lynam coached the San Diego / Los Angeles Clippers from 1983 to 1985, the Philadelphia 76ers from 1987 to 1992, and the Washington Bullets from 1995 to 1997. Lynam compiled a 158–118 record at the college level, and 328–392 in the NBA. He was also Philadelphia's general manager from 1992 to 1994.

Playing career
After graduating from West Catholic High School, he went to Saint Joseph's University. With the Hawks, he was a three-year starter. In 1961, Lynam was a key player on a Hawks team that advanced to the 1961 Final Four. The Hawks defeated Utah in a four-overtime game for third place. Lynam won the team MVP award after Jack Egan was expelled for his participation in the 1961 point shaving scandal.

Lynam played with the Hawks until 1963. That year, he was named the MVP of the Big 5 in his senior year.

Coaching career
He began his coaching career with the Fairfield Stags in 1968 where he coached two years. In 1973, he took the reins at American University in 1973, where he coached for five years. He coached the Eagles to one finals appearance in the East Coast Conference tournament.

In 1978, he returned to his alma mater. He coached St. Joseph's to an upset victory over #1 ranked DePaul by a score of 49–48 in the second round of the 1981 NCAA Division I men's basketball tournament. In their opening game his 9th seeded Hawks topped #8th seed Creighton 59–57.  They would win their third tournament game over #5 seed Boston College 42-41 before falling to the National Champion, Indiana at a game on their home floor in Bloomington.  Had they won that game Lynam's Hawks would have been in the Final Four at The Spectrum in their home town of Philadelphia.

Lynam has also served as an assistant coach for several teams, most notably the Sixers and the Portland Trail Blazers, the latter for head coach Maurice Cheeks. When Cheeks was hired as Philadelphia's coach for the 2005–06 season, Lynam was named an assistant. During the preseason, however, he was forced to leave the team due to an undisclosed medical condition. In January, 2006, Lynam retired from coaching.  However, on September 29, 2006 it was announced that Lynam, along with NBA hall of famer Moses Malone would be rejoining the 76ers as an assistant coach.
In July 2010, The Oregonian reported that Lynam was among candidates for an assistant coaching job in Portland.

On January 24, 2011, the Minnesota Timberwolves announced that Lynam would be joining the club as a part-time basketball operations consultant, evaluating pro personnel on the Wolves roster and throughout the NBA.

Starting in the 2011–12 season, Lynam serves as a pre-game and post-game analyst for the Philadelphia 76ers on NBC Sports Philadelphia.

Personal
Lynam's daughter, Dei, is a former anchor/reporter for NBC Sports Philadelphia for the Sixers. She once served as a sideline reporter for 76ers telecasts. She also worked as a Sideline Reporter for TNT's coverage of the NBA Playoffs from 2010 to 2015.
Now she helps call the 76ers G-League team, the Delaware Blue Coats games. He is also a grandfather to ten grandchildren. Lynam is known for his distinct Philadelphia accent.

Head coaching record

College

NBA

|- 
| align="left" |SDC
| align="left" |
|82||30||52||.366|| align="center" |6th in Pacific||—||—||—||—
| align="center" |Missed Playoffs
|- 
| align="left" |LAC
| align="left" |
|61||22||39||.361|| align="center" |(fired)||—||—||—||—
| align="center" |—
|- 
| align="left" |PHI
| align="left" |
|39||16||23||.410|| align="center" |4th in Atlantic||—||—||—||—
| align="center" |Missed Playoffs
|- 
| align="left" |PHI
| align="left" |
|82||46||36||.561|| align="center" |2nd in Atlantic||3||0||3||.000
| align="center" |Lost in first round
|- 
| align="left" |PHI
| align="left" |
|82||53||29||.646|| align="center" |1st in Atlantic||10||4||6||.400
| align="center" |Lost in Conf. Semifinals
|- 
| align="left" |PHI
| align="left" |
|82||44||38||.537|| align="center" |2nd in Atlantic||8||4||4||.500
| align="center" |Lost in Conf. Semifinals
|- 
| align="left" |PHI
| align="left" |
|82||35||47||.427|| align="center" |5th in Atlantic||—||—||—||—
| align="center" |Missed Playoffs
|- 
| align="left" |WSH
| align="left" |
|82||21||61||.256|| align="center" |7th in Atlantic||—||—||—||—
| align="center" |Missed Playoffs
|- 
| align="left" |WSH
| align="left" |
|82||39||43||.476|| align="center" |4th in Atlantic||—||—||—||—
| align="center" |Missed Playoffs
|- 
| align="left" |WSH
| align="left" |
|46||22||24||.478|| align="center" |(fired)||—||—||—||—
| align="center" |—
|-class="sortbottom"
| align="left" |Career
| ||720||328||392||.456|| ||21||8||13||.381

References

External links
 BasketballReference.com: Jim Lynam
 NBA.com coach file: Jim Lynam
 St. Joseph's biography

1941 births
Living people
American Eagles men's basketball coaches
American men's basketball coaches
American men's basketball players
Basketball coaches from Pennsylvania
Basketball players from Philadelphia
College men's basketball head coaches in the United States
Fairfield Stags men's basketball coaches
Los Angeles Clippers head coaches
National Basketball Association general managers
Philadelphia 76ers assistant coaches
Philadelphia 76ers executives
Philadelphia 76ers head coaches
Portland Trail Blazers assistant coaches
Saint Joseph's Hawks men's basketball coaches
Saint Joseph's Hawks men's basketball players
San Diego Clippers head coaches
Washington Bullets head coaches